Cyamella may refer to:
Cyamella (bone), a sesamoid bone in some primates
Cyamella (trilobite), a genus of trilobites